Peter Cochran (born January 12, 1971) was a U.S. soccer defender who played one season in the Western Soccer Alliance.  He was a member of the U.S. National Team at the 1989 FIFA U-16 World Championship.  Following a career ending knee injury, he entered the business world and is currently a technology investment manager at Vulcan Capital.

Youth
Cochran was born in Lake Oswego, Oregon and attended Lakeridge High School in Lake Oswego where he was a three time high school All-American.   In 1988, he spent the summer playing with the semi-professional F.C. Portland of the Western Soccer Alliance.  While UCLA, Indiana and Santa Clara University all offered Cochrane a soccer athletic scholarship, he elected to enter Harvard where he was named the 1989 Ivy League Rookie of the Year.  After his sophomore season at Harvard, Cochran transferred to Santa Clara University where he had an immediate impact, scoring five game winning goals for the Broncos.  In 1992 Cochrane was selected as a third team All-American.  In 1994, he was drafted in the ninth round by the San Jose Grizzlies of the CISL.  However, at some point, he suffered a career ending knee injury, leading him to retire from playing and entering the business world.  He later played from 2000 through 2002 for Club Olympia in the San Francisco Soccer Football League.

National team
Played on the U.S. National Team at the 1989 FIFA U-16 World Championship.  The U.S. 1-1-1 in group play, failing to qualify for the second round.

Business
Following his retirement from professional soccer, Cochran entered the business world, working at Walt Disney Company and the Kensington Technology Group.  At some point, he also co-founded Owners Pass, LLC.  In the late 1990s, he joined Fogdog Sports as the Director of Sales and Business Development.  However, he returned to Harvard in 1999 to gain an MBA which he was awarded in June 2000.  That spring, he was hired by CMGI@Ventures, moving to San Francisco, California.  He later moved to Danger, Inc. as the Director of Business Development and is currently an investment manager at Vulcan Capital where he specializes in consumer technology, software and wireless services.

References

External links
 November 21, 1989 Harvard Crimson

1971 births
Living people
United States men's youth international soccer players
Western Soccer Alliance players
Parade High School All-Americans (boys' soccer)
Portland Timbers (1985–1990) players
San Francisco Soccer Football League players
Santa Clara Broncos men's soccer players
American money managers
Harvard Crimson men's soccer players
Harvard Business School alumni
Sportspeople from Lake Oswego, Oregon
Soccer players from Oregon
American soccer players
Lakeridge High School alumni
Association football defenders